This is a list of countries by number of television broadcast stations.

List

References

Sources
 The World Factbook, accessed in June 2008. 

Lists of countries by economic indicator